Gutteridge Wood and Meadows is a Local Nature Reserve (LNR) in Yeading in the London Borough of Hillingdon, which is owned by Hillingdon Council and managed by the London Wildlife Trust (LWT). It is also part of the Yeading Brook Meadows Site of Metropolitan Importance for Nature Conservation, which includes two neighbouring reserves managed by the LWT, Ten Acre Wood and Yeading Brook Meadows LNRs.

The site is a mosaic of woods and meadows, bisected by Yeading Brook. The trees are principally oak, with some ash and silver birch. The northern edge of the meadow has a variety of wild flowers. Birds include kestrels, great spotted woodpeckers and kingfishers.

The boundary of the LNR is unclear.

There is access to the part of the site south of Yeading Brook from Lynhurst Crescent and by a footpath from Ten Acre Wood.

References

External links

Local nature reserves in Greater London
London Wildlife Trust
Meadows in Greater London
Nature reserves in the London Borough of Hillingdon